Baryshnikov (masculine) or Baryshnikova (feminine) is a Russian surname. Notable people with the surname include:

 Aleksandr Baryshnikov (born 1948), Soviet athlete
 Anastasia Baryshnikova (born 1990), Russian taekwondo practitioner
 Anna Baryshnikov (born 1992), American actress
 Mikhail Baryshnikov (born 1948), Russian American dancer
 Shura Baryshnikov (born 1981), American dancer, choreographer, dance educator and actress
 Yevhen Baryshnikov (born 1988), Ukrainian footballer

Russian-language surnames